Kommadagga is a settlement  west-north-west of Riebeek East and  north of Paterson. The name is from Khoikhoi and consists of two Khoikhoi words, 'Komma' searching for and 'dagga', the medicinal herb and loosely translates into 'searching for dagga'.

The Anglican church of St. George, Kommadagga is on the farm Three Fountains.

References 

Populated places in the Blue Crane Route Local Municipality